Gaj  is a village in the administrative district of Gmina Biskupiec, within Nowe Miasto County, Warmian-Masurian Voivodeship, in northern Poland.

The village has an approximate population of 120.

References

Gaj